Patricia B. O'Sullivan Lucey (September 1, 1926 – November 6, 2019) was an American amateur golfer.

She was born in New Haven, Connecticut, daughter of Marguerite Lawton and Patrick Brett O'Sullivan, a US Representative from Connecticut (1923–1925) and member of the Connecticut Supreme Court (1950–1957). She attended Katherine Gibbs College and Bradford College.

O'Sullivan won the 1950, 1951, and 1953 North and South Women's Amateur. She also won the 1951 Titleholders Championship, then one of the LPGA Tour's major championships. She represented the United States in the Curtis Cup in 1952 and won several tournaments in her native New England.

O'Sullivan was married to C. Gerald Lucey, member of the Massachusetts House of Representatives (1947–1953) and mayor of Brockton, Massachusetts (1952–1956).

O'Sullivan was a member of Race Brook Country Club in Orange, Connecticut from 1942. The Club named its inside nine golf course "The O'Sullivan" in her honor. She was inducted into the Connecticut State Golf Association Hall of Fame in 1967.

Major championships

Wins (1)

Team appearances
Amateur
Curtis Cup (representing the United States): 1952

References

American female golfers
Winners of LPGA major golf championships
Golfers from Connecticut
Sportspeople from New Haven, Connecticut
People from Orange, Connecticut
1926 births
2019 deaths
21st-century American women